Gol Afshad (also Romanized as Gol Afshād; also known as Gāv Afshād and Gol Afshān) is a village in Miankuh Rural District, in the Central District of Mehriz County, Yazd Province, Iran. At the 2006 census, its population was 63, in 35 families.

References 

Populated places in Mehriz County